Square Butte may refer to:

Square Butte, Montana, an unincorporated community
Square Butte (Montana), multiple summits in Montana
Square Butte (transmission line), an electrical transmission line in Minnesota
Square Butte Creek, a stream in North Dakota